Anderson v. Martin, 375 U.S. 399, was a United States Supreme Court case in which the Court ruled unconstitutional a Louisiana statute that required that the race of all candidates be listed on ballots.

Background

See also
 List of United States Supreme Court cases, volume 375

External links
 

Legal history of Louisiana
United States Supreme Court cases
United States Supreme Court cases of the Warren Court
United States Fourteenth Amendment case law
1964 in United States case law